Marbin-e Olya Rural District is a rural district (dehestan) in the Central District of Khomeyni Shahr County, Isfahan Province, Iran. At the 2006 census, its population was 8,432, in 2,283 families.  The rural district has 2 villages.

References 

Rural Districts of Isfahan Province
Khomeyni Shahr County